"Great Escape" (stylized in lowercase) was the fourth single created by the Japanese band Cinema Staff, and their third major song. It was released by Pony Canyon on August 21, 2013, and reached the number one spot on the Billboard Japan Hot Animation chart upon its debut. The song is best remembered for its use as the ending theme for the second half of season one of Attack on Titan.

B-side 
The single was released alongside the coupling B-side music compilation titled , which itself is composed of songs recorded live during the band's nationwide tour of Japan titled "Our Secret".

As for the intention behind the inclusion of these songs live versions instead of their official ones, lyricist Sohei Mishima commented, "If you listen to this, even people who have never been to a band live like us can feel the atmosphere."

Track listing

Chart performance

Certifications

References 

2013 in Japanese music
2013 singles
2013 songs
Anime songs
Attack on Titan
Japanese-language songs
Pony Canyon singles